{{Infobox cycling race
| name          = Vuelta a Colombia
| image         = 
| date          = August (until 2020)April (since 2021)
| region        = Colombia
| english       = Tour of Colombia
| localnames    = Vuelta a Colombia 
| nickname      = 
| discipline    = Road race
| competition   = Colombian Cycling Federation
| type          = Stage race
| organiser     = 
| first         = 
| number        = 72 (as of 2022)
| last          = 
| firstwinner   = 
| mostwins      =  (6 wins)
| mostrecent    = 
}}

The Vuelta a Colombia (Spanish for Tour of Colombia''') is an annual cycling road race, run over many stages throughout different regions in Colombia and sometimes Venezuela and Ecuador during the first days of August. It is organized by the Colombian Cycling Federation, and was previously included in the UCI America Tour.

History
The first Vuelta a Colombia was held in 1951 as an idea of Englishman Donald W. Raskin and a few of his friends, emulating the European Tour de France. It was a 1,233 kilometers race which was divided in 10 stages which included three rest days. Thirty-five cyclists lined up for the race and of which thirty finished the race. The first champion of the Vuelta was Efraín Forero Triviño who won seven stages of the race. For the second edition, the race was increased in stages to 13 and was around 1,670 km in length. It was held from the 12 to the 27 or 28 January 1952. It appears that 60 cyclists lined up for the race. The 3rd edition of the race was the first edition to have 15 stages that covered 1,750 km.

Over the years, there has been several serious accidents and even deaths during the race. Some of these cyclists, who have had very serious and career-ending accidents, include Conrado "Tito" Gallo, Gilberto Achicanoy, Felipe Liñán and Ernesto Santander. In 2005, there was a tragic accident in the Vuelta in which a local radio journalist, Alberto Martínez Prader, died while transmitting the race. Martinez was traveling in a jeep with José Fernando López and Héctor Urrego when, descending from the La Linea peak towards Calarcá, the vehicle lost control on a curve and fell into a ravine.

It is currently a fifteen-stage race that is regarded as one of the toughest races in cycling. The mountain passes that the peloton encounters are hundreds of metres higher than any of the passes used in the Tour de France.

The 2010 edition was won by Sergio Luis Henao of the Indeportes Antioquia–Idea–FLA–Lotería de Medellín Team ahead of teammate Óscar Sevilla and José Rujano, the previous year's winner.

Doping
On 21 November, Róbinson López (Lotería de Boyacá), current U23 Colombian champion, tested positive for the third generation blood booster – CERA. A week later, news broke that Luis Alberto Largo (Sogamoso–Argos–Cooservicios–Idrs), Edward Díaz, Jonathan Felipe Paredes and Fabio Nelson Montenegro (Ebsa–Indeportes Boyacá), Luis Camargo Flechas (Supergiros) and Óscar Soliz (Movistar Amateur Team) had all tested positive for CERA at the 2017 edition of the race.

Past winners

See also
 Vuelta a Colombia Femenina Oro y Paz

References

External links
 Results at Cycling Archives
 Esciclismo Vuelta a Colombia 
 Year by year stage results and general classification 1951-2006 (not all year files work) 

 
Cycle races in Colombia
Recurring sporting events established in 1951
UCI America Tour races
1951 establishments in Colombia
Super Prestige Pernod races